Mosley was a 1998 television serial (or mini-series) produced for Channel 4 based on British fascist Sir Oswald Mosley's life in the period between the two world wars. The series was directed by Robert Knights, from a screenplay by Laurence Marks and Maurice Gran, both better known for their television comedy series. It was based on the books Rules of the Game and Beyond the Pale by Nicholas Mosley, Mosley's son.

The series was released on VHS and DVD.

Episode details
The series was in four parts.

Part 1: Young Man in a Hurry (1918–1920) In 1918, as Britain rejoices at winning the First World War, a young army officer, Tom Mosley (Oswald), decides to run for Parliament. Using friends to gain entry to the most important houses, Mosley soon finds himself introduced to the Prime Minister David Lloyd George and indebted to a sharp-edged American, Maxine Elliott, who in turn will see her debt repaid in the bedroom. Mosley is elected as the youngest member of Parliament and raises his profile by attacking more senior politicians, including his own Prime Minister. Seeing an opportunity to step up in the world by seducing Cynthia (Cimmie) Curzon, the second daughter of Lord Curzon, and he unashamedly seduces her stepmother on the way.

Part 2: Rules of the Game (1924–1927) Mosley's marriage no more guarantees his faithfulness to Cimmie than his election as a Conservative MP guarantees his loyalty to the Party. Deeply immersed in a relationship with Jane Bewley, the wife of a Tory MP, Mosley's politics take him to the left and the new spirit of the Labour Party. But the Party finds Mosley's concepts of economic regeneration unrealistic. Nevertheless, he stands for and wins a front bench seat with the opposition Labour Party, although a blatant sexual scandal may cripple his prospects for the future.

Part 3: Breaking the Mould (1929–1933) Mosley and Cimmie both run for seats with the Labour Party and win as the Party sweeps the old Conservative rule from power. Disappointed that he is not appointed to their newly formed cabinet, Mosley finds comfort in forming his own New Party and forming an attachment with Diana Guinness. It is not long before Cimmie and Mosley's old comrades find themselves at odds with the New Party - both its politics and its methods of enforcement by appointed "stewards." Meanwhile, Benito Mussolini's rise to power in Italy encourages Mosley to remake himself in the mold of a Fascist, once again turning with an opportune tide.

Part 4: Beyond the Pale (1933–1940) Mosley is distraught at the decline in health of his wife Cimmie who, after years of his philandering, has lost the will to live. Financially supported by Mussolini in Italy, Mosley decided to establish the British Union of Fascists in her honour. While Diana Guinness establishes relationships with Dr. Joseph Goebbels in Germany, Mosley develops a relationship with Cimmie's sister Alexandra (Baba) in France. At a major meeting of the new organization, hecklers in the audience are beaten to the ground by the Fascist Blackshirts who salute their leader with Roman salutes. On a visit to Germany, Mosley marries Diana Guinness in the company of Joseph Goebbels and Adolf Hitler. But the health of the party will not last long.

Cast
 Jonathan Cake as  Sir Oswald 'Tom' Mosley, 6th Bt.
 Jemma Redgrave as  Lady Cimmie Curzon
 Hugh Bonneville as  Bob Boothby
 Flora Montgomery as  Baba (Lady Alexandra Curzon Metcalfe)
 Ralph Riach as  Ramsay MacDonald
 Windsor Davies as  David Lloyd George
Gresby Nash as Fruity Metcalfe
Karl Draper as  Makin
 Emma Davies as  Diana Mitford Guinness
Roger May as  John Strachey
 Paul Ireland as  Allan Young
 Orlando Wells as  Cecil Beaton
 Ken Jones as  J.H. Thomas
Eric Allan as  Philip Snowden
 Berwick Kaler as  Arthur Henderson
Arturo Venegas as  Count Grandi

Part 1
Debora Weston as  Maxine Elliott
Philip Dunbar as  Philip Sassoon
 Robert Lang as  Lord Curzon
 Devon Scott as Lady Grace Curzon
 Hugh Simon as  Winston Churchill
 Richenda Carey as  Lady Mosley
 Dermot Martin as  Sgt. O'Sullivan

Part 2
 Caroline Langrishe as  Jane Bewley
 Jeremy Child as  Major Bewley
 Roger Brierley as  Neville Chamberlain
 Edward Highmore as  Derek Johnson

Part 3
 Jonathan Coy as  Harold Nicolson
Ben Pullen as  Peter Howard
 Sonya Walger as  Barbara Hutchinson
 David Henry as  William Morris

Part 4
Stephen Gressieux as  Benito Mussolini
 Nigel Davenport as Lord Rothermere
Colum Convey as  William Joyce
Mike Burnside as  Neil Francis Hawkins
 Brigitte Kahn as  Margherita Sarfatti
Anouschka Menzies as  Unity Mitford
 Stephan Grothgar as  Putzi Hansfstaengl
John Straiton as  James Maxton
Reinhard Michaels as  Adolf Hitler
 Erich Redman as  Joseph Goebbels
William Boscaven as  Nicholas Mosley

References

External links

Films about fascists
1998 British television series debuts
1998 British television series endings
1990s British drama television series
1990s British television miniseries
Channel 4 television dramas
Channel 4 miniseries
Television series by Fremantle (company)
Cultural depictions of Oswald Mosley
Cultural depictions of Winston Churchill
Cultural depictions of David Lloyd George
Cultural depictions of Benito Mussolini
Cultural depictions of Adolf Hitler
Cultural depictions of Joseph Goebbels
English-language television shows
Television shows set in London
Television series set in the 1930s
Films directed by John Alexander